Hiroden Hakushima Station is a Hiroden terminal station on the Hiroden Hakushima Line, located in Higashi-hakushima, Naka-ku, Hiroshima. The station is operated by the Hiroshima Electric Railway.

Routes
There is one route that serves Hakushima Station:
 Hakushima - Hatchobori Route

Station layout
The station consists of one side platform serving one track. A crosswalk connects the platform with the sidewalk. There is a small shelter located on the middle of the platform. The track ends immediately at the end of the platform; there is no buffer stop.

Adjacent stations

Surrounding area
 Astram Line Hakushima Station (1 km away)
 Hiroshima Teishin Hospital

History
 Opened on the Main Line on November 23, 1912.
 Closed due to the atomic bomb on August 6, 1945.
 Moved and renamed to "Hakushima-syuten" on June 10, 1952.
 Renamed to "Hakushima" on March 30, 1960.

See also

 Hiroden Streetcar Lines and Routes

References

Hakushima Station
Railway stations in Japan opened in 1912